Plebulina emigdionis (formerly known as Plebejus emigdionis), the San Emigdio blue, is a species of blue in the family of butterflies known as Lycaenidae. It is the sole representative of the monotypic genus Plebulina. It is found in North America.

References

Further reading

External links

Polyommatini
Articles created by Qbugbot
Butterflies described in 1905